Hamish Dalzell (born 16 January 1996 in New Zealand) is a New Zealand rugby union player who plays for Auckland in the National Provincial Championship. He also plays for the New York Ironworkers in Major League Rugby (MLR). His playing position is lock.

Reference list

External links
itsrugby.co.uk profile

1996 births
New Zealand rugby union players
Living people
Rugby union locks
Canterbury rugby union players
Saitama Wild Knights players
Auckland rugby union players
Dalzell-Whitelock family
Crusaders (rugby union) players
Rugby New York players